The Aqueduct of Vanvitelli or Caroline Aqueduct is a 38 km aqueduct that supplied water to the Reggia di Caserta and the San Leucio complex from the foot of the Taburno massif and springs of the Fizzo Contrada, in the territory of Bucciano.

Mostly underground, the aqueduct is noted for its well-preserved, three-tier,  tufa-arched section bridging the Valle di Maddaloni between Monte Longano (to the east) and Monte Garzano (to the west).

Commissioned by Charles of Bourbon, the aqueduct was designed by and named after Luigi Vanvitelli. Construction began in March 1753 and it opened on 7 May 1762. It is located in SS265, 81020 Valle di Maddaloni CE, Italy.

External links
Siti UNESCO: L'acquedotto Carolino e i Ponti della Valle di Maddaloni

Vanvitelli
Neoclassical architecture in Campania
Buildings and structures in Campania
Buildings and structures in Caserta
World Heritage Sites in Italy
Luigi Vanvitelli buildings